Bhattarai Danda  is a City in Syangja District in Nepal. Majority of its people are Brahmins and they are Bhattarai families, so the entire village is named accordingly. According to the 2011 Nepal census, held by Central Bureau of Statistics, it had a total population of 5510. There are 2,610 males and 2,800 females living in 846 households.

Education
Primary education is provided by Shree Gandaki Primary School. Secondary education is provided by Rivervalley Mathematics Anon Solution - RMAS

References

External links 
Mero Syangja
Chapakot Municipality
District Coordination Committee Office, Syangja, Nepal

See also

Syangja District
Populated places in Syangja District